Mizpah in Gilead may refer to:

 Mizpah in Gilead (Genesis)
 Mizpah in Gilead (Joshua)
 Mizpah in Gilead (Judges)